Lester Caslow (born July 10, 1984) is an American mixed martial artist currently competing in the Featherweight division.

Mixed martial arts career

Early career
Before making his professional debut, Caslow held an amateur record of 1-0. In a span of four years, Caslow compiled a record of 6–3 (1) in smaller organizations before debuting for Bellator.

Bellator
On October 21, 2010, Caslow made his debut for the promotion against Kenny Foster at Bellator 33. Caslow lost the bout via three-round unanimous decision.

Caslow eventually returned to the Bellator cage on September 10, 2011 at Bellator 49 against James Jones. He won the fight via TKO in the second round.

He then faced Scott Heckman on April 13, 2012 at Bellator 65. Caslow lost the bout via first-round rear-naked choke submission.

Caslow would then compile a record of 3–1 in other promotions before returning to Bellator against Jay Haas at Bellator 109 on November 22, 2013. Caslow won the fight via guillotine choke submission in the third round.

In a rematch, Caslow faced Jay Haas at Bellator 118 on May 2, 2014. Caslow defeated Haas for a second time via guillotine choke submission, this time in the first round.

Mixed martial arts record

|-
|Loss
|align=center|15–11 (1)
|Mike Santiago
|Submission (rear-naked choke)
|Ring of Combat 54
|
|align=center|1
|align=center|3:40
|Atlantic City, New Jersey, United States
|For Ring of Combat Featherweight Championship.
|-
|Win
|align=center|15–10 (1)
|Kenny Foster
|Submission (guillotine choke)
|Ring of Combat 53
|
|align=center|3
|align=center|2:04
|Atlantic City, New Jersey, United States
|
|-
|Loss
|align=center|14–10 (1)
|Francisco Isata
|Decision (unanimous)
|Cage Fury FC 44: Smith vs. Williams
|
|align=center|3
|align=center|5:00
|Atlantic City, New Jersey, United States
|
|-
|Win
|align=center|14–9 (1)
|David Harris
|Submission (choke)
|Fight Club OC: For the Leathernecks IV
|
|align=center|1
|align=center|0:59
|Jacksonville, North Carolina, United States
|
|-
|Win
|align=center|13–9 (1)
|Justin Dalton
|Submission (guillotine choke)
|Cage Fury FC 44: Bezerra vs. Makashvili 2
|
|align=center|1
|align=center|2:11
|Bethlehem, Pennsylvania, United States
|
|-
|Win
|align=center|12–9 (1)
|Jay Haas
|Submission (guillotine choke)
|Bellator 118
|
|align=center|1
|align=center|2:29
|Atlantic City, New Jersey, United States
|
|-
|Loss
|align=center|11–9 (1)
|Brian Kelleher
|Submission (rear-naked choke)
|Cage Fury FC 31: Heckman vs. Lentz
|
|align=center|2
|align=center|1:34
|Atlantic City, New Jersey, United States
|
|-
|Win
|align=center|11–8 (1)
|Jay Haas
|Submission (guillotine choke)
|Bellator 109
|
|align=center|3
|align=center|2:44
|Bethlehem, Pennsylvania, United States
|Return to Featherweight.
|-
|Win
|align=center|10–8 (1)
|Brylan Van Artsdalen
|Submission (rear-naked choke)
|Cage Fury FC 26: Sullivan vs. Martinez
|
|align=center|1
|align=center|3:55
|Atlantic City, New Jersey, United States
|
|-
|Win
|align=center|9–8 (1)
|Tom Backman
|KO (punches)
|Locked in the Cage 15
|
|align=center|1
|align=center|0:44
|New Kensington, Pennsylvania, United States
|Lightweight bout.
|-
|Loss
|align=center|8–8 (1)
|Artur Rofi
|Submission (arm-triangle choke)
|Cage Fury FC 19: Sullivan vs. Lane
|
|align=center|2
|align=center|2:47
|Atlantic City, New Jersey, United States
|For Cage Fury Featherweight Championship.
|-
|Win
|align=center|8–7 (1)
|Brian van Hoven
|Submission (guillotine choke)
|Ring of Combat 41
|
|align=center|2
|align=center|2:27
|Atlantic City, New Jersey, United States
|Lightweight bout.
|-
|Loss
|align=center|7–7 (1)
|Scott Heckman
|Submission (rear-naked choke)
|Bellator 65
|
|align=center|1
|align=center|3:40
|Atlantic City, New Jersey, United States
|
|-
|Loss
|align=center|7–6 (1)
|Duane van Helvoirt
|Submission (triangle choke)
|Ring of Combat 39
|
|align=center|1
|align=center|1:49
|Atlantic City, New Jersey, United States
|Catchweight (150 lbs) bout.
|-
|Win
|align=center|7–5 (1)
|James Jones
|TKO (punches)
|Bellator 49
|
|align=center|2
|align=center|0:15
|Atlantic City, New Jersey, United States
|
|-
|Loss
|align=center|6–5 (1)
|Eddie Fyvie
|Decision (unanimous)
|Cage Fury FC 7: No Mercy
|
|align=center|3
|align=center|5:00
|Atlantic City, New Jersey, United States
|
|-
|Loss
|align=center|6–4 (1)
|Kenny Foster
|Decision (unanimous)
|Bellator 33
|
|align=center|3
|align=center|5:00
|Philadelphia, Pennsylvania, United States
|
|-
|Win
|align=center|6–3 (1)
|Andy Main
|Decision (unanimous)
|Ring of Combat 28
|
|align=center|3
|align=center|4:00
|Atlantic City, New Jersey, United States
|
|-
|NC
|align=center|5–3 (1)
|Felipe Arantes
|No Contest
|Respect Is Earned 3: Philly Biker Brawl
|
|align=center|3
|align=center|3:06
|Oaks, Pennsylvania, United States
|
|-
|Win
|align=center|5–3
|Matt McManmon
|Submission (armbar)
|Ring of Combat 26
|
|align=center|1
|align=center|3:20
|Atlantic City, New Jersey, United States
|
|-
|Win
|align=center|4–3
|Kyle Gray
|Submission (rear-naked choke)
|World Cagefighting Alliance: Caged Combat
|
|align=center|3
|align=center|3:24
|Atlantic City, New Jersey, United States
|
|-
|Loss
|align=center|3–3
|Daniel Mason-Straus
|Decision (split)
|Extreme Challenge: Mayhem at the Marina
|
|align=center|3
|align=center|5:00
|Atlantic City, New Jersey, United States
|
|-
|Win
|align=center|3–2
|Joey Camacho
|TKO (punches)
|World Cagefighting Alliance: Pure Combat
|
|align=center|1
|align=center|0:51
|Atlantic City, New Jersey, United States
|
|-
|Loss
|align=center|2–2
|Tim Troxell
|Submission (armbar)
|Battle Cage Xtreme 5
|
|align=center|1
|align=center|4:47
|Atlantic City, New Jersey, United States
|
|-
|Loss
|align=center|2–1
|Pat Audinwood
|Decision (unanimous)
|Battle Cage Xtreme 4
|
|align=center|3
|align=center|5:00
|Atlantic City, New Jersey, United States
|
|-
|Win
|align=center|2–0
|Ryan McCarthy
|Decision (unanimous)
|Battle Cage Xtreme 3
|
|align=center|3
|align=center|5:00
|Atlantic City, New Jersey, United States
|
|-
|Win
|align=center|1–0
|Michael Murray
|TKO (punches)
|Extreme Challenge 81
|
|align=center|2
|align=center|3:36
|West Orange, New Jersey, United States
|

References

American male mixed martial artists
Living people
Featherweight mixed martial artists
1984 births